Steven James Richards (born 11 July 1972) is a New Zealand-Australian racing driver, currently competing in the Porsche Carrera Cup Australia Championship.

Richards, the son of seven-time Bathurst 1000 winner Jim Richards, is himself a five-time Bathurst 1000 winner, having won the event in 1998, 1999, 2013, 2015 and 2018. Colloquially known as 'Richo', he also won the Bathurst 24 Hour in 2002.

Career history

Early career
Richards' first major career success was winning the Australian Formula Ford Championship on his second attempt in 1994 for Garry Rogers Motorsport. In 1995, Richards made his debut in the Bathurst 1000, finishing fourth for Gibson Motorsport with Anders Olofsson. Richards continued his association with Garry Rogers Motorsport in the years following, competing in the Australian Super Touring Championship from 1995 to 1997 driving an Alfa Romeo 155, Honda Accord and Nissan Primera and making his Australian Touring Car Championship debut for the team in 1996 in a Holden VR Commodore. Richards competed with his father Jim at the Bathurst 1000 in 1996 and 1997, finishing second in the latter. Richards continued with the team for 1998 before leaving to take up a testing role with Nissan in England.

At the 1998 AMP Bathurst 1000 Richards finished second in a Nissan Primera, only two seconds behind his father Jim. A month later driving a Ford EL Falcon, he won the FAI 1000 with Jason Bright for Stone Brothers Racing.

Supercars Championship
In 1999 Richards took up a full-time drive with Gibson Motorsport in 1999, as a team-mate to Greg Murphy in a Holden VT Commodore. Richards finished seventh in the championship with the highlight being defending his Bathurst crown with Murphy. By winning his second Bathurst title in a Holden, he became the first driver to win the Bathurst 1000 in both a Ford and Holden, and remains the only driver to do so in consecutive years. Richards continued with Gibson Motorsport in 2000, winning the inaugural Canberra 400 as well as a round at Calder Park Raceway.

In 2001, Richards moved to Ford Tickford Racing. Richards finished 12th in the standings for the team in 2001. With Ford Tickford Racing scaling back to one car, Richards moved to Perkins Engineering in 2002. He continued with the team for five years and achieved consistent championship finishes between fifth and seventh. Richards won two rounds for the team, both at the Perth 400 at Barbagallo Raceway.

In 2007, Richards made another manufacturer switch, joining Ford Performance Racing. Richards started competitively for the team, with championship finishes of seventh and eighth, but dropped off in 2009 and 2010 with finishes of thirteenth and fifteenth. Richards was subsequently replaced by Will Davison for 2011, and finished his full-time career with a podium in the final race of the season at the Sydney 500. Richards' highlights for the team were winning the Skycity Triple Crown in 2008, and podium finishes at the 2007 Sandown 500 and 2009 Phillip Island 500 with Owen Kelly and Mark Winterbottom respectively. Richards and Winterbottom were leading the 2007 Bathurst 1000 late in the race before Winterbottom went off the track in wet conditions.

Endurance co-driver
Following his full-time career ending, Richards became a highly sought-after co-driver for V8 Supercars' two endurance events, the Sandown 500 and Bathurst 1000. He decided to stay on with Ford Performance Racing, renewing his partnership with Winterbottom. In 2013, Richards and Winterbottom won the 2013 Bathurst 1000 on their sixth attempt together. It was the first Bathurst victory for Winterbottom and the team, and Richards' first since 1999.

After his success in 2013, Richards was poached by Triple Eight Race Engineering to drive with Craig Lowndes from 2014 onwards in what had become known as the Pirtek Enduro Cup. The move brought Richards a fourth Bathurst victory in 2015. In doing this Richards joined Lowndes, who along with Tony Longhurst and Jamie Whincup had matched the feat of winning in both a Ford and Holden since Richards had achieved it, as the only two drivers to win more than one Bathurst 1000 for both Ford and Holden. Richards won the race again with Lowndes in 2018 winning his Fifth Bathurst crown becoming one of the most successful winners of the great race throughout the current decade and sixth on the all-time list of Bathurst champions.

Richards announced his retirement from Supercars racing after the 2019 season.

Endurance racing
Richards won the inaugural Bathurst 24 Hour race in 2002 driving a Holden Monaro 427C for Garry Rogers Motorsport. Richards won the race alongside Garth Tander, Cameron McConville and Nathan Pretty. Driving the same car in the 2003 race, the same quartet finished in second place, less than a second behind their teammates Greg Murphy, Todd Kelly, Jason Bright, and Peter Brock, who had formed a famous partnership with his father Jim in the 1970s and 1980s.

Richards competed in the 2014 24 Hours of Spa with Roger Lago, David Russell and Steve Owen, driving a Lamborghini Gallardo LP600+ GT3. They did not finish the race. Richards has also achieved a class victory at the Bathurst 12 Hour, in 2012.

Carrera Cup

After the conclusion of his full-time V8 Supercars career, Richards entered the Australian Carrera Cup Championship in 2011 in a team backed by Laser Plumbing & Electrical. He consistently became a top-five championship runner since joining the series. His highlight was in 2014 when he won the championship title and broke the stranglehold on the series held by Craig Baird. It was Richards' first championship title in twenty years. Richards slipped back in the following two years before stepping back from the series to focus on his team's entry in the Australian GT Championship.

Australian GT
In 2013 and 2014, Richards competed in selected events of the Australian GT Championship in a Lamborghini Gallardo alongside Justin McMillan. They finished fifth in the 2014 championship. Richards then made a one-off appearance in the 2015 season in a Chevrolet Camaro.

In 2016, Richards re-joined the series full-time, this time with his own team, Steven Richards Motorsport. The team became the factory-supported customer entrant for the new BMW M6 GT3 in Australia. The team has also entered two cars in the 2017 Bathurst 12 Hour.

Personal life
Before taking up motor racing full-time, Richards served his apprenticeship as an aircraft engineer.

Richards is married to Angela (m. 1998) and has two children, Clayton (born 2000) and Priya (born 2001).

Richards lives with his family in Melbourne, Victoria.

Career results

Supercars Championship results
(Races in bold indicate pole position) (Races in italics indicate fastest lap)

Complete Bathurst 1000 results

* Super Touring race

Complete Australian Carrera Cup Championship results
(key) (Races in bold indicate pole position – 1 point awarded all races) (Races in italics indicate fastest lap) (* signifies that driver lead feature race for at least one lap – 1 point awarded)

Complete Bathurst 24 Hour results

Complete Bathurst 12 Hour results

References

External links
 Official Website of Steven Richards
 Official Laser Racing Porsche Carrera Cup Team Website
 V8 Supercars Official Profile
 Driver Database stats
 Profile on Racing Reference

1972 births
New Zealand racing drivers
Supercars Championship drivers
Living people
Bathurst 1000 winners
Formula Ford drivers
Australian Touring Car Championship drivers
Sportspeople from Auckland
V8SuperTourer drivers
Blancpain Endurance Series drivers
24 Hours of Spa drivers
Australian Endurance Championship drivers
Garry Rogers Motorsport drivers
BMW M drivers